Dankworth is a surname formed from the German forename "Tancred", which mutated to a hard D in English, combined with Old English "Worth" a farmstead. Notable people with the surname include:

Alec Dankworth (born 1960), English jazz bassist and composer, son of Cleo Laine and John Dankworth
Avril Dankworth (1922–2013), English music educator, sister of John Dankworth and sister-in-law of Cleo Laine
Jacqui Dankworth (born 1963), English jazz singer. daughter of Cleo Laine and John Dankworth
John Dankworth (1927–2010), English composer, saxophonist and clarinetist, husband of Cleo Laine